DWON (104.7 FM), broadcasting as 104.7 iFM, is a radio station owned and operated by the Radio Mindanao Network. The station's studio and transmitter are located at the 3rd floor, Marigold Bldg., M.H. del Pilar St., Brgy. Herrero, Dagupan. It operates 24 hours a day.

References

External links
iFM Dagupan FB Page
iFM Dagupan Website

Radio stations established in 1978
Radio stations in Dagupan